Jahns or Jähns is a surname. Notable people with the surname include:

Annette Jahns (1958–2020), German operatic mezzo-soprano and contralto, and opera director
Friedrich Wilhelm Jähns (1809–1888), German music scholar, voice teacher, and composer
Sigrid Jahns (born 1945), German historian

See also
Jahn, another surname
Jahn's